Dolphin Club may refer to:

 Dolphin Club (San Francisco), an American athletic club, established in 1877.
 Dolphin Club (Norway), a Norwegian music club, established in 1966.
 "The Dolphin Club", a single by Espen Lind from the album This Is Pop Music
 Dolphin Club, former name for Dolphin Show, a musical theatre organization at Northwestern University
 Dolphin F.C. (Dublin), an Irish association football club
 Dolphin RFC, a rugby club in Cork, Ireland

See also 
 Dolphin (disambiguation)#Sports, list of sports clubs named Dolphins